Muriel Coneo Paredes (March 15, 1987) is a Colombian Olympic athlete specializing in the middle-distance running events. She won multiple medals on the continental level, including the gold medal in the 1500 m at the 2015 Pan American Games and the 2014 Central American and Caribbean Games.

Muriel was born on Isla Fuerte, a Caribbean island belonging to the Bolívar Department, Colombia on March 15, 1987 as the oldest of four sisters between Carlos Coneo and Alicia Paredes. She began her athletic career at age of 14 when she moved to Medellin in 2002 for training and competing in the Heptathlon. Later, under guidance of Libardo Hoyos, her current coach, she began to run middle distance events including 800 m and 1500 m in which she set several national records and competed at continental and world level as a junior athlete. In 2013, she began to train for 3000 m steeplechase and the same year she placed first at the 2013 Bolivarian Games in Trujillo, Peru]. In 2017, she ran her first international 5000 m in the 2017 Mt. SAC Relays (Torrance, CA) where she set a PB of 15:41.55

Competition record

Personal bests
800 metres – 2:03.81 (Fortaleza, 11 May 2011)
1500 metres – 4:06.99 (Huelva, 3 June 2016)
3000 metres steeplechase – 9:43.16 (Norwalk, 15 April 2016)

References

External links

1987 births
Living people
People from Bolívar Department
Colombian female middle-distance runners
Colombian female steeplechase runners
Pan American Games gold medalists for Colombia
Pan American Games medalists in athletics (track and field)
Athletes (track and field) at the 2015 Pan American Games
Athletes (track and field) at the 2019 Pan American Games
World Athletics Championships athletes for Colombia
Athletes (track and field) at the 2016 Summer Olympics
Olympic athletes of Colombia
Central American and Caribbean Games gold medalists for Colombia
Competitors at the 2014 Central American and Caribbean Games
Colombian female cross country runners
Athletes (track and field) at the 2018 South American Games
South American Games gold medalists for Colombia
South American Games medalists in athletics
Central American and Caribbean Games medalists in athletics
Medalists at the 2015 Pan American Games
South American Games gold medalists in athletics